Darebin railway station is located on the Hurstbridge line in Victoria, Australia. It serves the north-eastern Melbourne suburb of Ivanhoe, and opened on 8 May 1922.

Darebin is the eighth least-used station on Melbourne's electrified rail network.

History
Darebin station opened on 8 May 1922, and is named after the nearby Darebin Creek and the locality of Darebin, west of Ivanhoe. The word is believed to be Indigenous for 'swallow'.

In 1951, the line between Alphington and Ivanhoe was duplicated. The present day Platform 2 was also provided in that year.

During the 1977/1978 financial year, the present station buildings were provided.

Platforms and services
Darebin has two side platforms. It is served by Hurstbridge line trains.

Platform 1:
  all stations and limited express services to Flinders Street

Platform 2:
  all stations and limited express services to Macleod, Greensborough, Eltham and Hurstbridge

Transport links
Dysons operates one bus route via Darebin station, under contract to Public Transport Victoria:
 : Heidelberg station – University of Melbourne (off-peak extension to Queen Victoria Market)

References

External links
 Melway map at street-directory.com.au

Railway stations in Melbourne
Railway stations in Australia opened in 1922
Railway stations in the City of Banyule